Kafka's Dick is a 1986 play by Alan Bennett. It is a play about the nature of fame, and how reputation is gained.

Plot
Set in the 1980s in a Yorkshire suburban dwelling, Kafka aficionado Sydney and his wife Linda are visited by Franz Kafka and his friend Max Brod who are both long dead. (Kafka had left instructions for all his works to be burned, which Brod chose to ignore.)

As the play progresses, it becomes clear that Kafka's wish was for anonymity, and that he had serious issues with his father, who turns up. The father knows a very personal secret about his son, which Kafka is terrified will be disclosed.

References

Kafka's Dick
Plays based on real people
Plays set in England
Works about Franz Kafka
Cultural depictions of Franz Kafka
1986 plays